Thương Ân  is a commune (xã) and village in Ngân Sơn District, Bắc Kạn Province, in Vietnam.

Geography 

 Area: 67,36 km²
 Population: 1943 people (updated in 1999)
 Population density: 29 people / km².

Location 

 The North is close to: Hưng Đạo commune, Tam Kim commune and Hoa Thám commune of Nguyên Bình district, Cao Bằng province.
 East is close to: Bằng Vân commune.
 The South is close to: Bằng Vân, Đức Vân and Vân Tùng communes.
 The West is close to: Cốc Đán commune.

The villages 
Villages in Thượng Ân commune: Nà Bưa, Slành, Nà Y, Ruồm A, Ruồm B, Hang Rậu, Roòng Thù, Khuổi Sảo, Nà Cà, Tặc, Phia Pảng, Phiêng Khìt, Thẳm Ông, Nà Pài, Khuổi Rắt, Luộc, Nà Choán, Nà Hin.

Economy 
Thượng Ân commune is on the list of ethnic minorities and mountainous areas in Bắc Kạn province. 10 villages in the commune on the list of extremely difficult villages include:

 Roỏng Thù
 Hang Slậu
 Phia Pảng
 Nà Pài 
 Thẳm Ông
 Khuổi Slặt
 Phiêng Khít
 Nà Cà 
 Khuổi Slảo
 Roỏng Tặc

History 
- Before 1964 the commune was called Thanh Tâm. In 1964, the name was changed to Thượng Ân and remained the same until now.

- Bản Duồm A village, Thượng Ân commune is a place with revolutionary tradition of Bac Kan province. The first Party cell of the Bắc Kạn Province was established here in 1975.

References

 Ngân Sơn District website
 Bac Kan province newspaper

Populated places in Bắc Kạn province
Communes of Bắc Kạn province